LISA Pathfinder, formerly Small Missions for Advanced Research in Technology-2 (SMART-2), was an ESA spacecraft that was launched on 3 December 2015 on board Vega flight VV06. The mission tested technologies needed for the Laser Interferometer Space Antenna (LISA), an ESA gravitational wave observatory planned to be launched in 2037. The scientific phase started on 8 March 2016 and lasted almost sixteen months. In April 2016 ESA announced that LISA Pathfinder demonstrated that the LISA mission is feasible.

The estimated mission cost was €400 million.

Mission
LISA Pathfinder placed two test masses in a nearly perfect gravitational free-fall, and controlled and measured their relative motion with unprecedented accuracy. The laser interferometer measured the relative position and orientation of the masses to an accuracy of less than 0.01 nanometres, a technology estimated to be sensitive enough to detect gravitational waves by the follow-on mission, the Laser Interferometer Space Antenna (LISA).

The interferometer was a model of one arm of the final LISA interferometer, but reduced from millions of kilometers long to 40 cm.  The reduction did not change the accuracy of the relative position measurement, nor did it affect the various technical disturbances produced by the spacecraft surrounding the experiment, whose measurement was the main goal of LISA Pathfinder.  The sensitivity to gravitational waves, however, is proportional to the arm length, and this is reduced several billion-fold compared to the planned LISA experiment.

LISA Pathfinder was an ESA-led mission. It involved European space companies and research institutes from France, Germany, Italy, The Netherlands, Spain, Switzerland, UK, and the US space agency NASA.

LISA Pathfinder science
LISA Pathfinder was a proof-of-concept mission to prove that the two masses can fly through space, untouched but shielded by the spacecraft, and maintain their relative positions to the precision needed to realise a full gravitational wave observatory planned for launch in 2037. The primary objective was to measure deviations from geodesic motion. Much of the experimentation in gravitational physics requires measuring the relative acceleration between free-falling, geodesic reference test particles.

In LISA Pathfinder, precise inter-test-mass tracking by optical interferometry allowed scientists to assess the relative acceleration of the two test masses, situated about 38 cm apart in a single spacecraft. The science of LISA Pathfinder consisted of measuring and creating an experimentally-anchored physical model for all the spurious effects – including stray forces and optical measurement limits – that limit the ability to create, and measure, the perfect constellation of free-falling test particles that would be ideal for the LISA follow-up mission.

In particular, it verified:
 Drag-free attitude control of a spacecraft with two proof masses,
 The feasibility of laser interferometry in the desired frequency band (which is not possible on the surface of Earth), and
 The reliability and longevity of the various components—capacitive sensors, microthrusters, lasers and optics.

For the follow-up mission, LISA, the test masses will be pairs of 2 kg gold/platinum cubes housed in each of three separate spacecraft 2.5 million kilometers apart.

Spacecraft design
LISA Pathfinder was assembled by Airbus Defence and Space in Stevenage (UK), under contract to the European Space Agency. It carried a European "LISA Technology Package" comprising inertial sensors, interferometer and associated instrumentation as well as two drag-free control systems: a European one using cold gas micro-thrusters (similar to those used on Gaia), and a US-built "Disturbance Reduction System" using the European sensors and an electric propulsion system that uses ionised droplets of a colloid accelerated in an electric field.  The colloid thruster (or "electrospray thruster") system was built by Busek and delivered to JPL for integration with the spacecraft.

Instrumentation
The LISA Technology Package (LTP) was integrated by Airbus Defence and Space Germany, but the instruments and components were supplied by contributing institutions across Europe.  The noise rejection technical requirements on the interferometer were very stringent, which means that the physical response of the interferometer to changing environmental conditions, such as temperature, must be minimised.

Environmental influences
On the follow-up mission, eLISA, environmental factors will influence the measurements the interferometer takes. These environmental influences include stray electromagnetic fields and temperature gradients, which could be caused by the Sun heating the spacecraft unevenly, or even by warm instrumentation inside the spacecraft itself. Therefore, LISA Pathfinder was designed to find out how such environmental influences change the behaviour of the inertial sensors and the other instruments. LISA Pathfinder flew with an extensive instrument package which can measure temperature and magnetic fields at the test masses and at the optical bench. The spacecraft was even equipped to stimulate the system artificially: it carried heating elements which can warm the spacecraft's structure unevenly, causing the optical bench to distort and enabling scientists to see how the measurements change with varying temperatures.

Spacecraft operations
Mission control for LISA Pathfinder was at ESOC in Darmstadt, Germany with science and technology operations controlled from ESAC in Madrid, Spain.

Lissajous orbit 

The spacecraft was first launched by Vega flight VV06 into an elliptical LEO parking orbit. From there it executed a short burn each time perigee was passed, slowly raising the apogee closer to the intended halo orbit around the Earth–Sun  point.

Chronology and results 

The spacecraft reached its operational location in orbit around the Lagrange point L1 on 22 January 2016, where it underwent payload commissioning. The testing started on 1 March 2016. In April 2016 ESA announced that LISA Pathfinder demonstrated that the LISA mission is feasible.

On 7 June 2016, ESA presented the first results of two months' worth of science operation showing that the technology developed for a space-based gravitational wave observatory was exceeding expectations. The two cubes at the heart of the spacecraft are falling freely through space under the influence of gravity alone, unperturbed by other external forces, to a factor of 5 better than requirements for LISA Pathfinder. In February 2017, BBC News reported that the gravity probe had exceeded its performance goals.

LISA Pathfinder was deactivated on 30 June 2017.

On 5 February 2018, ESA published the final results. Precision of measurements could be improved further, beyond current goals for the future LISA mission, due to venting of residue air molecules and better understanding of disturbances.

See also

 Einstein Telescope, a European gravitational wave detector
 GEO600, a gravitational wave detector located in Hannover, Germany
 LIGO, a gravitational wave observatory in USA
 Taiji 1, a Chinese technology demonstrator for gravitational wave observation launched in 2019
 Virgo interferometer, an interferometer located close to Pisa, Italy

References

External links

 LISA and LISA Pathfinder's Homepage
 LISA Pathfinder mission home at ESA
 LISA Pathfinder at eoPortal
 Max Planck Institute for Gravitational Physics (Albert Einstein Institute Hannover) 

European Space Agency space probes
Space probes launched in 2015
Spacecraft using halo orbits
Spacecraft launched by Vega rockets
Interferometers
Space telescopes
Gravitational-wave telescopes
Technology demonstrations
Artificial satellites at Earth-Sun Lagrange points